"Hey" is a song by Lil Jon featuring 3OH!3. It was released as the second single from Lil Jon's 2010 album, Crunk Rock. It was also featured on the Jersey Shore soundtrack.

Music video 
The video was filmed in Hollywood and directed by David Rousseau. It was released on August 26, 2010. The video revolves around a girls-only pool party, featuring the Jersey Shore cast with track artists Lil Jon and 3OH!3. Bandmember Nathaniel Motte explained: "The concept of the 'Hey' video is assemble the largest amount of hot chicks you can and throw a pool party … which is kinda crazy because we're never invited to those kind of parties."

Commercial performance 
"Hey" debuted at number 70 on the Billboard Hot 100 upon the release of the album and moved up to number 62 the next week, before falling off the Hot 100. It also debuted at number 46 on the Hot Digital Songs chart and reached number 33 in its second week.

References

2010 singles
Lil Jon songs
Songs written by Lil Jon
3OH!3 songs
Song recordings produced by Dr. Luke
Songs written by Dr. Luke
Song recordings produced by Benny Blanco
Songs written by Nathaniel Motte
Songs written by Sean Foreman
2010 songs
Universal Republic Records singles